{{Infobox person
| name          = Alexandre Aja
| image         = Alexandre Aja (17493159043) (cropped).jpg 
| alt           = 
| caption       = Aja in 2015
| birth_name    = Alexandre Jouan-Arcady
| birth_date    = 
| birth_place   = Paris, France
| occupation    = 
| years_active  = 1997present
| known_for     = 
| notable_works = Haute Tension, The Hills Have Eyes, Mirrors, Piranha 3D, Oxygen
| father        = Alexandre Arcady
| relatives     = Diane Kurys (stepmother)Sacha Sperling (half-brother)
}}

Alexandre Jouan-Arcady, known professionally as Alexandre Aja (born 7 August 1978), is a French filmmaker best known for his work in the horror genre. He rose to international stardom for his 2003 horror film Haute Tension (known as High Tension in the US and Switchblade Romance in the UK). He has also directed the films The Hills Have Eyes (2006), Mirrors (2008), Piranha 3D (2010), Horns (2013) and  Crawl (2019).

Personal life
Aja's pseudonymous surname is formed from the initial letter of each of the three parts of his real name. He was born in Paris, France, and is the son of Jewish French Pied-Noir director Alexandre Arcady and French cinema critic Marie-Jo Jouan. 

Career

He made his directorial debut at the age of eighteen with the short film Over the Rainbow, which received a Cannes Film Festival Golden Palm Award nomination for best short film. In 1999 he directed Furia, a film based on Julio Cortázar's short story Graffiti. From Furia and his next features, he frequently works with Grégory Levasseur as writers such as in The Hills Have Eyes, Mirrors, P2, and Piranha 3D. Levasseur also made his works as production designer too.

Aja directed Haute Tension, which released in 2003 in France and in 2005 in the US, and placed Aja on the map of the horror movie genre. The French slasher, though sticking to horror conventions, pushed the envelope of gore and tension. The film is an unauthorized reinterpretation of the novel "Intensity", by Dean Koontz. Favouring make-up effects over computer-generated imagery, the film quickly found respect among horror fans. It was released in the US as High Tension, after some editing. The film was nominated for the grand prize at the Amsterdam Fantastic Film Festival, and earned Aja awards for Best Direction and Best Fantasy Film at the Sitges - Catalan International Film Festival.

After seeing High Tension, American director Wes Craven asked Aja to come up with a concept for the remake of his 1977 film The Hills Have Eyes. Craven subsequently asked Aja to direct the movie, which was released with an R rating in the US after extensive editing.

His next project was a horror film entitled Mirrors, about a mysterious mirror that brings out the worst aspects of people whenever they look at themselves in it. The film is a remake of the K-Horror film Into the Mirror. Aja directed Piranha 3D, a horror movie about prehistoric piranhas in Arizona. It is a remake of the 1978 film Piranha.

Because Aja was working on Mirrors, he did not direct The Hills Have Eyes 2, which was released on 10 March 2007.

In 2004, Aja was named by Variety on the Ten Directors to Watch list. He is a member of the so-called Splat Pack, a term coined by film historian Alan Jones in Total Film magazine for a new wave of directors making brutally violent horror films. The other Splat Pack members are Darren Lynn Bousman, Neil Marshall, Greg McLean, Eli Roth, James Wan, Leigh Whannell, and Rob Zombie.

Aja has been associated with the New French Extremity film movement.

Aja produced a remake of the 1980 horror slasher Maniac, starring Elijah Wood. The film was released in 2012. In 2013, he directed the dark fantasy thriller Horns, starring Daniel Radcliffe, Juno Temple, Joe Anderson, James Remar, Kelli Garner and Max Minghella. He also produced the 2014 horror film The Pyramid directed by Grégory Levasseur and starring Ashley Hinshaw, Denis O'Hare, and James Buckley. Aja produced and directed the 2016 psychological thriller film The 9th Life of Louis Drax, which is based on a novel by Liz Jensen.

Aja is set to direct a live action adaptation of the manga series Space Adventure Cobra, and the Mice and Mystics film for Dreamworks Animation. In 2019, Alexandre Aja directed his highest grossing and best reviewed film yet, Crawl.''

Filmography

Other credits

See also
 Furia (album)

References

External links

Alexandre Aja on Fox Searchlight
Eat My Brains! interview with Alexandre Aja
Alexandre Aja interview on sci-fi-online.com

1978 births
Horror film directors
Living people
Film directors from Paris
French film producers
French male screenwriters
French screenwriters
21st-century French Jews